is the tenth studio album by Japanese singer Yōko Oginome. Produced by Panta and released through Victor Entertainment on November 21, 1989, the album features the hit single "You're My Life", as well as a Japanese-language cover of The Drifters' hit single "Under the Boardwalk". It was Oginome's last album to be released on LP. The album was reissued on April 21, 2010 with eight bonus tracks as part of Oginome's 25th anniversary celebration. 

The album peaked at No. 12 on Oricon's albums chart and sold over 49,000 copies.

Track listing

Charts

References

External links
 
 
  

1989 albums
Yōko Oginome albums
Japanese-language albums
Victor Entertainment albums

ja:FAIR TENSION